David N. Senty is a retired major general in the United States Air Force.

Biography
Senty is a native of Sheboygan, Wisconsin. He has attended Drake University, the University of Northern Colorado, the University of Georgia, the John F. Kennedy School of Government at Harvard University, the Kellogg School of Management at Northwestern University and the Kenan-Flagler Business School at the University of North Carolina at Chapel Hill.

Career
Senty was commissioned an officer in the Air Force in 1975. He was then assigned to the 94th Tactical Airlift Wing and later attended the Squadron Officer School. In 1979, he became a wing intelligence officer at Tactical Air Command. Also that year, he began working with the Central Intelligence Agency. In 1982, he attended the Air Command and Staff College.

In 1983, Senty was assigned to the Defense Intelligence Agency. He was then stationed at the National Reconnaissance Office and later attended the Air War College. Senty also deployed to serve in the Gulf War. In 1993, he became an intelligence director of the Office of the United States Secretary of Defense at The Pentagon. He attended the Foreign Service Institute in 1995.

Senty was stationed at Wright-Patterson Air Force Base from 1996 until 1998, when he became a mobilization assistant to the Commander of the Air Intelligence Agency. In 2001, he returned to The Pentagon in the Office of the Deputy Chief of Staff for Air and Space Operations. He would also serve in the War in Afghanistan (2001–present) and the Iraq War.

In 2008, he served as a mobilization assistant to the Director of the National Security Agency and the Chief of the Central Security Service. Later that year, he became a mobilization assistant to the Commander of Air Force Cyber Command (Provisional). The following year, he was briefly a mobilization assistant to the Commander of the Twenty-Fourth Air Force before becoming Chief of Staff of United States Cyber Command. Senty retired in 2011.

Awards and decorations

Awards he received during his career include the Air Force Distinguished Service Medal, the Defense Superior Service Medal, the Legion of Merit with oak leaf cluster, the Bronze Star Medal, the Meritorious Service Medal, the Joint Service Commendation Medal, the Air Force Commendation Medal, the Air Force Achievement Medal, the Organizational Excellence Award with three oak leaf clusters, the Air Force Recognition Ribbon, the National Defense Service Medal with service star, the Southwest Asia Service Medal with service star, the Afghanistan Campaign Medal with service star, the Iraq Campaign Medal with service star, the Global War on Terrorism Expeditionary Medal, the Global War on Terrorism Service Medal, the Air Force Expeditionary Service Ribbon with gold frame, the Armed Forces Reserve Medal with Mobilization Device, the Kuwait Liberation Medal (Saudi Arabia) and the Kuwait Liberation Medal (Kuwait).

References

Living people
People from Sheboygan, Wisconsin
Military personnel from Wisconsin
United States Air Force generals
Recipients of the Air Force Distinguished Service Medal
Recipients of the Legion of Merit
United States Air Force personnel of the Gulf War
United States Air Force personnel of the War in Afghanistan (2001–2021)
United States Air Force personnel of the Iraq War
Drake University alumni
University of Northern Colorado alumni
University of Georgia alumni
Harvard Kennedy School alumni
Kellogg School of Management alumni
UNC Kenan–Flagler Business School alumni
Air Command and Staff College alumni
Air War College alumni
Year of birth missing (living people)